The following is a list of notable deaths in October 2021.

Entries for each day are listed alphabetically by surname. A typical entry lists information in the following sequence:
 Name, age, country of citizenship at birth, subsequent country of citizenship (if applicable), reason for notability, cause of death (if known), and reference.

October 2021

1
British Idiom, 4, American Thoroughbred racehorse.
Buddy Alliston, 87, American football player (Winnipeg Blue Bombers, Denver Broncos).
Oğuzhan Asiltürk, 86, Turkish politician, MP (1973–1980, 1991–2002), minister of the interior (1974–1977) and of industry and technology (1977–1978), COVID-19.
John Blackburn, 73, British Anglican priest, chaplain general of the British Army (2000–2004).
Renán Fuentealba Moena, 104, Chilean politician, deputy (1957–1965), president of Christian Democratic Party (1961–1965, 1972–1973) and senator (1965–1973).
Raymond Gniewek, 89, American violinist.
Nora Gúnera de Melgar, 78, Honduran politician, first lady (1975–1978), mayor of Tegucigalpa (1990–1994) and deputy (2007–2014).
Fred Hill, 81, English footballer (Bolton Wanderers, national team).
William Izarra, 74, Venezuelan politician, military official and diplomat, senator (1998–1999) and ambassador to North Korea (since 2021), COVID-19.
Alfredo Jadresic, 96, Chilean Olympic high jumper (1948) and scientist.
Lissy Jarvik, 97, Dutch-born American psychiatrist.
Ibrahim Kefas, 73, Nigerian politician, military administrator of Cross River State (1993–1994) and Delta State (1994–1996).
Vytautas Kolesnikovas, 72, Lithuanian painter and politician, member of the Supreme Council (1990–1992) and signatory of the Act of the Re-Establishment of the State of Lithuania.
Paul Linger, 46, English footballer (Charlton Athletic, Brighton & Hove Albion), pancreatic cancer.
Ewert Ljusberg, 76, Swedish musician, president of the Republic of Jamtland (since 1989).
Frank LoCascio, 89, American mobster (Gambino crime family).
Bob Mendes, 93, Belgian accountant and writer.
Hugo Anthony Meynell, 85, English academic.
Robin Morton, 81, Irish folk musician.
Andreas Neocleous, 82, Cypriot lawyer and politician, founder of Andreas Neocleous & Co and MP (1970–1976), COVID-19.
Eberhard Panitz, 89, German writer.
Sune Sandbring, 93, Swedish footballer (Malmö FF, national team).
Andrea Schroeder, 57, American politician, member of the Michigan House of Representatives (since 2019), stomach cancer.
Brian Sherratt, 77, English footballer (Oxford United, Stoke City, Barnsley).
Sir Dennis Walters, 92, British politician, MP (1964–1992).
Earle Wells, 87, New Zealand sailor and rower, Olympic champion (1964).
Zhang Hanxin, 85, Chinese physicist, member of the Chinese Academy of Sciences.
Zhang Xudong, 59, Chinese military officer, commander of the Western Theater Command (2020–2021), cancer.

2
Tajdar Babar, 85, Indian politician, Delhi MLA (1993–2008).
Ziauddin Ahmed Bablu, 66, Bangladeshi politician, MP (2014–2019), complications from COVID-19.
Jack Biondolillo, 81, American bowler, dementia with complicating kidney failure.
Dana Bumgardner, 67, American politician, member of the North Carolina House of Representatives (since 2013), cancer.
Anthony Downs, 90, American economist and politologist (An Economic Theory of Democracy).
Richard Evans, 86, American actor (Peyton Place, Islands in the Stream, Dirty Little Billy).
Michel Fernex, 92, Swiss physician.
Agostino Gambino, 88, Italian jurist and politician, minister of communications (1995–1996).
Chuck Hartenstein, 79, American baseball player (Chicago Cubs, Pittsburgh Pirates, St. Louis Cardinals).
Jim Hess, 84, American college and high school football coach (Angelo State Rams, Stephen F. Austin Lumberjacks, New Mexico State Aggies).
Matt Holmes, 54, British military officer, Commandant General Royal Marines (2019–2021).
Hans Kruse, 91, Samoan civil servant and rugby union player (national team).
Ladislaus Löb, 88, Romanian-born Swiss Germanist and Holocaust survivor.
Alfredo Martínez Moreno, 98, Salvadoran jurist, diplomat and writer, president of the Supreme Court (1968) and director of the Academia Salvadoreña de la Lengua (1969–2006).
Dattaram Maruti Mirasdar, 94, Indian writer and humourist.
Mortimer Mishkin, 94, American neuropsychologist.
Valeriu Mițul, 60, Moldovan political activist, mayor of Corjova, Dubăsari (since 1995).
Leonard Moss, 89, English Anglican clergyman, archdeacon of Hereford (1991–1997).
Ioannis Palaiokrassas, 87, Greek politician, minister of finance (1990–1992) and European commissioner (1993–1994).
Inder Bir Singh Passi, 82, Indian mathematician.
Colin Pratt, 82, English motorcycle speedway rider (Poole Pirates, Stoke Potters, Hackney Hawks), cancer.
Dave Roberts, 88, Panamanian-American baseball player (Houston Colt .45s, Pittsburgh Pirates, Tokyo Yakult Swallows).
Bill Russo, 74, American college football coach (Lafayette Leopards, Wagner Seahawks).
Umer Shareef, 61, Pakistani comedian and television host (The Shareef Show Mubarak Ho), pneumonia.
Herta Staal, 91, Austrian actress (The Charming Young Lady, My Sister and I, Where the Ancient Forests Rustle).
Franciszek Surmiński, 86, Polish racing cyclist.
Sebastião Tapajós, 78, Brazilian guitarist and composer.
John Wes Townley, 31, American racing driver (NASCAR Camping World Truck Series), shot.
Michel Tubiana, 68, French lawyer and jurist.
Sidney Walton, 102, American World War II veteran.
Major Wingate, 37, American basketball player (Springfield Armor, Shanxi Zhongyu, Tofas Bursa).

3
Todd Akin, 74, American politician, member of the Missouri (1989–2001) and U.S. House of Representatives (2001–2013), cancer.
James Baar, 92, American author and public relations consultant.
Paul Barratt, 77, Australian public servant, secretary of the Department of Primary Industries and Energy (1996–1998) and Defence (1998–1999).
Luis Belló, 92, Spanish football player (Hércules, Cieza) and manager (Real Zaragoza).
Blanka Bohdanová, 91, Czech actress (Romeo, Juliet and Darkness, Když rozvod, tak rozvod, Thirty Cases of Major Zeman).
Siegfried Borchardt, 67, German political activist.
Lee Brozgol, 80, American artist.
Sir John Chilcot, 82, British civil servant, kidney disease.
Antonio Debenedetti, 84, Italian writer, journalist and poet.
Samantha Epasinghe, 54, Sri Lankan actress, COVID-19.
Anouman Brou Félix, 86, Ivorian musician.
Josep Maria Forn, 93, Spanish film director (Companys, procés a Catalunya) and actor.
Alan Grahame, 67, British motorcycle speedway rider (Poole Pirates, Hull Vikings, Cradley Heathens), injuries sustained in a race collision.
Cynthia Harris, 87, American actress (Mad About You, Edward & Mrs. Simpson, Three Men and a Baby).
Neil Hawryliw, 65, Canadian ice hockey player (New York Islanders).
José Luis Lamadrid, 91, Mexican footballer (Club Necaxa, national team).
Daniel Leone, 28, Italian footballer (Pontedera, Reggiana, Catanzaro), brain cancer.
Ivan Lubennikov, 70, Russian painter.
Maurice Malleret, 90, French writer and historian.
Irwin Marcus, 102, American psychiatrist.
Jorge Medina, 94, Chilean Roman Catholic cardinal, bishop of Rancagua (1987–1993) and Valparaíso (1993–1996), prefect of the Congregation for Divine Worship (1996–2002).
Ghanashyam Nayak, 77, Indian actor (Taarak Mehta Ka Ooltah Chashmah, Krantiveer, Hum Dil De Chuke Sanam), cancer.
Tomas Norström, 65, Swedish actor (The Hunters, Good Evening, Mr. Wallenberg, The White Viking), brain tumor.
Dan Petrescu, 68, Romanian businessman, plane crash.
Marc Pilcher, 53, British makeup artist (Bridgerton, Downton Abbey, Mary Queen of Scots), Emmy winner (2021), COVID-19.
Marta Rojas, 93, Cuban journalist (Granma) and writer.
Neal Sher, 74, American lawyer.
Bernard Tapie, 78, French businessman, politician and actor (Men, Women: A User's Manual), deputy (1989–1996) and president of Olympique de Marseille (1986–1994), stomach cancer.
Lars Vilks, 75, Swedish visual artist, founder of Ladonia, traffic collision.

4
Louise Bäckman, 94, Swedish Sámi academic.
Roger Stuart Bacon, 95, Canadian politician, premier of Nova Scotia (1990–1991) and Nova Scotia MLA (1970–1993).
Benedita Barata da Rocha, 72, Portuguese immunologist.
Mohamed Ali Bouleymane, 79, Tunisian politician, mayor of Tunis (1986–1988, 1990–2000).
Mike Connelly, 85, American football player (Dallas Cowboys).
Sergey Danilin, 61, Russian luger, Olympic silver medallist (1984).
Laurie Davidson, 94, New Zealand yacht designer (NZL 32).
Eugenio Duca, 71, Italian politician, deputy (1994–2006), heart attack.
Terry Eades, 77, Northern Irish football player (Cambridge United, Watford) and manager (Histon), cancer.
Michael Ferguson, 84, British television director and producer (EastEnders, The Bill, Casualty).
Willy Haeberli, 96, Swiss-born American nuclear physicist.
John Paul Harney, 90, Canadian politician, MP (1972–1974).
John Hastie, 83, New Zealand sport shooter.
Edwin Holliday, 82, English footballer (Middlesbrough, Sheffield Wednesday, Hereford United).
Bazyl Jakupov, 56, Kazakhstani politician, governor of Kostanay (2015–2019).
Peter Jenkins, 77, Canadian politician, mayor of Dawson City (1980–1994, 2009–2012) and Yukon MLA (1996–2006), COVID-19. (death announced on this date)
Ivan Johnson, 68, Bahamian-born English cricketer (Worcestershire) and journalist.
Alan Kalter, 78, American television announcer (Late Show with David Letterman).
Philippe Levillain, 80, French historian and academic.
Li Zhengming, 90, Chinese engineer, member of the Chinese Academy of Engineering.
Zbigniew Pacelt, 70, Polish Olympic swimmer (1968, 1972) and modern pentathlete (1976).
Budge Patty, 97, American Hall of Fame tennis player.
Valeriy Pidluzhny, 69, Ukrainian long jumper, Olympic bronze medallist (1980).
Eddie Robinson, 100, American baseball player (Cleveland Indians) and general manager (Texas Rangers, Atlanta Braves), World Series champion (1948).
Sebastian Shaw, 53, Vietnamese-born American serial killer.
Shakti Sinha, 64, Indian civil servant, director of the Nehru Memorial Museum & Library (2015–2019), cardiac arrest.
Joy Watson, 83, New Zealand children's author.
John Welsby, 83, British rail executive, chairman of the British Railways Board (1995–1999), cancer.

5
Nadia Chaudhri, 43, Pakistani-born Canadian psychologist, ovarian cancer.
Cristóvão de Aguiar, 81, Portuguese writer.
Siran Upendra Deraniyagala, 79, Sri Lankan archaeologist, director general of archaeology (1992–2001).
Pat Fish, 63, English musician (The Jazz Butcher).
Jürgen Goslar, 94, German film director (Terror After Midnight, Albino) and actor (Derrick).
Hobo Jim, 68, American folk singer-songwriter, cancer.
Ernest Lee Johnson, 61, American convicted criminal, execution by lethal injection.
Robert Hosp, 81, Swiss footballer (Lausanne-Sport, national team).
Abdulazeez Ibrahim, 63, Nigerian politician, senator (1999–2007).
Pierre Légaré, 72, Canadian comedian.
Fathali Oveisi, 75, Iranian actor (Captain Khorshid, Hamoun, Love-stricken).
Yosef Paritzky, 66, Israeli politician, member of the Knesset (1999–2006) and minister of national infrastructures (2003–2004).
Barney Platts-Mills, 76, British film director (Bronco Bullfrog, Private Road).
Nikolai Rasheyev, 86, Ukrainian film director (Bumbarash) and screenwriter (Vertical).
Manfred Hermann Schmid, 74, German musicologist.
Jerry Shipp, 86, American basketball player (Phillips 66ers, national team), Olympic champion (1964).
Pavao Štalter, 91, Croatian animator, director, and screenwriter.
Zoran Stanković, 66, Serbian military officer and politician, minister of defence (2005–2007) and health (2011–2012), COVID-19.
Keith Thomas, 92, English footballer (Exeter City, Plymouth Argyle, Sheffield Wednesday).
Lynn A. Thompson, 81, American religious leader, President of the Priesthood of the Apostolic United Brethren (since 2014).
Nikos Tsoumanis, 31, Greek footballer (Kerkyra, Panthrakikos, Apollon Pontou), suffocation.
Pam Williams, 88, New Zealand businesswoman and philanthropist.
Ye Keming, 84, Chinese engineer, member of the Chinese Academy of Engineering.
Juozas Žemaitis, 95, Lithuanian Roman Catholic prelate, bishop of Vilkaviškis (1991–2002).

6
Juhan Aare, 73, Estonian journalist.
Sir Noel Anderson, 77, New Zealand judge, president of the Court of Appeal (2004–2006) and justice of the Supreme Court (2006–2008).
Andrianafidisoa, Malagasy military officer and convicted coupist, leader of the 2006 Malagasy coup d'état attempt.
Lou Antonelli, 64, American author.
Tomoyasu Asaoka, 59, Japanese footballer (Nippon Kokan, Yomiuri, national team).
Vigen Chitechyan, 80, Armenian politician and diplomat, deputy prime minister (1993–1995) and ambassador to European Union (1997–2009).
Gerald Home, 70, British actor (Return of the Jedi, London Boulevard) and puppeteer (Little Shop of Horrors), liver cancer.
Patricia McMahon Hawkins, 72, American diplomat, ambassador to Togo (2008–2011).
Patrick Horgan, 92, British-born American actor (Ryan's Hope, The Doctors).
John Joiner, 87, Australian footballer (North Melbourne).
Atta Kwami, 65, Ghanaian artist.
Otilia Larrañaga, 89, Mexican actress (The Price of Living) and dancer.
Muriel Lezak, 94, American neurophysicist.
Valeriano Martínez, 60, Spanish politician, minister of finance of Galicia (since 2015) and member of the Parliament of Galicia (2016–2017, 2020–2021), cardiac arrest.
Gunawan Maryanto, 45, Indonesian author and theater director, heart attack.
Luisa Mattioli, 85, Italian actress (The Angel of the Alps, Mia nonna poliziotto, Romulus and the Sabines).
V. M. M. Nair, 101, Indian diplomat and civil servant, ambassador to Norway (1960–1967), Poland (1967–1971) and Morocco (1971–1975).
Matti Puhakka, 76, Finnish politician, MP (1975–1991, 1995–1996), minister of transport (1983–1984) and labor (1987–1991), cancer.
Sewa Singh Sekhwan, 71, Indian politician, Punjab MLA (1977–1985), liver disease.
Oleg Seleznyov, 62, Russian politician, senator (since 2017), COVID-19.
Martin J. Sherwin, 84, American historian and biographer (American Prometheus), Pulitzer Prize winner (2006), complications from lung cancer.
Sheldon Stone, 75, American particle physicist.
Arvind Trivedi, 82, Indian actor (Ramayan, Vikram Aur Betaal, Desh Re Joya Dada Pardesh Joya), MP (1991–1996), multiple organ failure.
Ted Venetoulis, 87, American politician, Baltimore County executive (1974–1978).
Yesudasan, 83, Indian cartoonist, founder of the Kerala Cartoon Academy.

7
Azartash Azarnoush, 83, Iranian linguist and scholar.
Clement Bowman, 91, Canadian chemical engineer.
James Brokenshire, 53, British politician, MP (since 2005), secretary of state for Northern Ireland (2016–2018) and housing, communities and local government (2018–2019), lung cancer.
Ray Charambura, 92, Canadian football player (Winnipeg Blue Bombers).
Chen Wenxin, 95, Chinese biologist, member of the Chinese Academy of Sciences.
Enzo Collotti, 92, Italian historian and academic.
Jorge Coscia, 69, Argentine film director and politician, deputy (2005–2009).
Jean-Daniel Flaysakier, 70, French doctor and journalist, heart failure.
Fotini Dekazou Stefanopoulou, Greek politician, MP (1993–1996).
Raoul Franklin, 86, British physicist and academic administrator, vice-chancellor of City, University of London (1978–1998).
András Gálszécsy, 87, Hungarian politician, minister of civilian intelligence services (1990–1992).
Johnny Gold, 89, British nightclub owner and promoter, co-founder of Tramp.
Clifford Grant, 91, Australian operatic bass singer.
Rick Jones, 84, Canadian-born British television presenter (Play School, Fingerbobs) and musician (Meal Ticket), esophageal cancer.
David Kirby, 82, English cricketer (Cambridge University, Leicestershire).
Étienne Mougeotte, 81, French journalist and media director, tonsil cancer.
Deep Pal, 68, Indian cinematographer (Pehla Nasha).
Félix Palomo, 84, Spanish politician, senator (1977–1982), member (1983–1995) and president (1983–1987, 1988–1995) of the Parliament of La Rioja.
Reggie Parks, 87, Canadian professional wrestler (AWA) and engraver (WWE), COVID-19.
Andy Porter, 84, Scottish footballer (Watford).
Mike Ray, 85, Canadian politician, Ontario MPP (1987–1990).
Eva Rönström, 88, Swedish Olympic gymnast (1956).
Myriam Sarachik, 88, Belgian-born American experimental physicist.
Jan Shutan, 88, American actress (Room 222, Ben Casey).
Peter Silverman, 90, Canadian journalist.
Louise Slade, 74, American food scientist.
Jože Snoj, 87, Slovenian poet and novelist.
Ralph Spinella, 98, American Olympic fencer (1960).
Franklin Standard, 72, Cuban basketball player, Olympic bronze medalist (1972).
Ronald S. Stroud, 88, Canadian historian and academic.
Petra Zais, 64, German politician, member of the Landtag of Saxony (2014–2019).

8
Pauline Bart, 91, American sociologist.
Chang Yung-hsiang, 91, Taiwanese screenwriter (Beautiful Duckling, The Story of a Small Town, If I Were for Real).
Nola Chilton, 99, Israeli theatre director.
Rabah Driassa, 87, Algerian painter and singer.
Marina Galanou, Greek LGBT rights activist.
Mordechai Geldman, 75, German-born Israeli poet and psychologist, cancer.
Peter Gill, Pakistani politician, Punjab MPA (since 2018).
Petru Guelfucci, 66, French singer.
Billy Lamont, 85, Scottish football player (Hamilton Academical, Albion Rovers) and manager (East Stirlingshire).
Owen Luder, 93, British architect.
Tony MacMahon, 82, Irish button accordion player and radio and television broadcaster, subject of Slán leis an gCeol.
Jack Manning, 92, New Zealand architect.
Arthur Mattuck, 91, American mathematician.
Jim McInally, 73, Canadian ice hockey player (Hamilton Red Wings, Nashville Dixie Flyers).
Henri Mitterand, 93, French academic and author.
Raymond T. Odierno, 67, American military officer, chief of staff of the Army (2011–2015), cancer.
Richard Ohmann, 90, American literary critic.
Ian Ormond, 72, Scottish-born New Zealand footballer (Blockhouse Bay, national team).
Jim Pembroke, 75, English-born Finnish rock musician (Wigwam).
Piraisoodan, 65, Indian lyricist (En Rasavin Manasile, Thayagam, Krishna Krishna).
Anton Polyakov, 33, Ukrainian politician, MP (since 2019).
Grigory Sanakoev, 86, Russian chess player.
Sandra Scarr, 85, American psychologist.
Sanpei Shirato, 89, Japanese manga artist (Kamui), aspiration pneumonia.
Jorge Antonio Solis, 70, American jurist, judge (1991–2016) and chief judge (2014–2016) of the U.S. District Court for Northern Texas.
Jem Targal, 74, American bassist (Third Power) and singer-songwriter.
Jup Weber, 71, Luxembourgish politician, MEP (1994–1999).
Achmad Rizal Zakaria, 58, Indonesian politician, vice mayor of Mojokerto (since 2018).

9
Ali Atwa, 60s, Lebanese hijacker (TWA Flight 847), cancer.
Abolhassan Banisadr, 88, Iranian politician, president (1980–1981), minister of foreign affairs (1979) and finance (1979–1980).
Rich Barry, 81, American baseball player (Philadelphia Phillies).
Garnett Brown, 85, American jazz trombonist.
Lauren Cho, 30, American music teacher and chef. (body discovered on this date)
Chito Gascon, 57, Filipino lawyer, chairman of the Commission on Human Rights (since 2015), COVID-19.
A. M. Harun-ar-Rashid, 88, Bangladeshi physicist.
Helmut Herbst, 86, German film director, producer and screenwriter (Eine deutsche Revolution).
Keitaro Hoshino, 52, Japanese boxer, WBA minimumweight champion (2000–2001, 2002).
J. Martin Hunter, 84, British arbitration lawyer.
Tim Johnston, 80, British Olympic long distance runner (1968).
Farooq Feroze Khan, 82, Pakistani military officer, chief of air staff (1991–1994) and chairman joint chiefs of staff committee (1994–1997), heart attack.
Sikandar Hayat Khan, 87, Pakistani politician, president (1991–1996) and prime minister (1985–1990, 2001–2006) of Azad Kashmir, heart disease.
Jean Ledwith King, 97, American attorney, teacher and political activist.
Hosea Macharinyang, 35, Kenyan runner.
Yossi Maiman, 75, German-born Israeli banking executive, president (2002–2013) and CEO (2006–2013) of Ampal-American Israel Corporation.
Shawn McLemore, 54, American gospel singer.
Stephen Brendan McMahon, 66, British neuroscientist.
Donn B. Parker, American computer scientist.
Pierre Pinoncelli, 92, French performance artist.
Gilbert Py, 87, French operatic tenor.
Mario Roccuzzo, 80, American actor (The Majestic, Barney Miller, Mr. Belvedere).
Anne Saxelby, 40, American cheesemonger.
Germain Sengelin, 84, French judge.
Charlotte Strandgaard, 78, Danish author.

10
Granville Adams, 58, American actor (Oz, Homicide: Life on the Street, Empire), cancer.
Beat Arnold, 43, Swiss politician, national councillor (2015–2019), brain tumor.
Ramon Barba, 82, Filipino inventor and horticulturist.
Alban Bensa, 73, French anthropologist.
Richard J. Blackwell, 92, American philosopher.
Rajnarayan Budholiya, 60, Indian politician, MP (2004–2009), heart attack.
Ken Casanega, 100, American football player (San Francisco 49ers).
Jim Coley, 70, American politician, member of the Tennessee House of Representatives (2007–2020).
Toshirō Daigo, 95, Japanese judoka.
Cornel Drăgușin, 95, Romanian football player (Steaua București) and manager (Iraq national team, Syria national team).
Jacob E. Goodman, 87, American mathematician and composer.
Rafiqul Haque, 84, Bangladeshi journalist (Jugantor, The Azadi, Kishore Bangla).
Bob Herron, 97, American stuntman (Spartacus, Diamonds Are Forever, Rocky) and actor, complications from a fall.
David Kennedy, 82, American advertising executive, co-founder of Wieden+Kennedy.
Abdul Qadeer Khan, 85, Pakistani nuclear physicist, complications from COVID-19.
Tasos Kourakis, 73, Greek politician, MP (2007–2019).
Joyce Lebra, 95, American historian.
Steve Longworth, 73, English snooker player.
Peter O'Donnell, 97, American businessman, investor, and philanthropist.
Luis de Pablo, 91, Spanish composer (Generación del 51).
Megan Rice, 91, American nun and nuclear disarmament activist.
Evelyn Richter, 91, German art photographer.
Fandas Safiullin, 85, Russian politician, deputy (2000–2003), COVID-19.
Sathyajith, 72, Indian actor (Dhumm, Abhi, Apthamitra).
Evi Touloupa, 97, Greek archaeologist, curator of antiquities at Acropolis.
Ruthie Tompson, 111, American animator (Pinocchio, Fantasia, Dumbo).
Piet Wijnberg, 63, Dutch footballer (Ajax, NEC, DS '79).

11
Emiliano Aguirre, 96, Spanish paleontologist.
Lukas David, 87, Austrian violinist.
Tony DeMarco, 89, American Hall of Fame boxer, world welterweight champion (1955).
Duane E. Dewey, 89, American soldier, Medal of Honor recipient.
Emani 22, 22, American R&B singer, injuries sustained in an accident.
Deon Estus, 65, American bassist and vocalist (Wham!, George Michael).
Brian Goldner, 58, American business executive and film producer (Transformers, G.I. Joe), CEO of Hasbro (since 2008), cancer.
Jack J. Grynberg, 89, Polish-born American petroleum developer.
Kevin Hallett, 91, Australian Olympic swimmer (1948).
Enamul Haque, 78, Bangladeshi chemist and actor (Emiler Goenda Bahini, Ei Shob Din Ratri, Amar Bondhu Rashed).
Trevor Hemmings, 86, British football club (Cork City, Preston North End) and racehorse owner.
Bill Hudson, 88, American politician, member of the Alaska House of Representatives (1987–1995, 1997–2003).
Orphy Klempa, 70, American politician, member of the West Virginia House of Delegates (2006–2010) and Senate (2010–2012).
George W. Knight III, 89, American minister.
Lavoisier Maia, 93, Brazilian physician and politician, governor of Rio Grande do Norte (1979–1983), senator (1987–1995), and deputy (1999–2007).
Muhammad Pervaiz Malik, 73, Pakistani politician, MNA (1997–1999, 2002–2007, since 2010) and minister for commerce and textile (2017–2018), cardiac arrest.
Boris Minakov, 93, Russian diplomat, Soviet ambassador to Ivory Coast (1986–1990).
Antônio Afonso de Miranda, 101, Brazilian Roman Catholic prelate, bishop of Taubaté (1981–1996).
Barry Mora, 80, New Zealand operatic baritone.
Olav Nilsen, 79, Norwegian footballer (Viking, national team).
Geert Jan van Oldenborgh, 59, Dutch climate scientist, cancer.
Elio Pandolfi, 95, Italian actor (In Olden Days, Obiettivo ragazze, For a Few Dollars Less).
Boris Pineda, 62, Salvadoran chess player.
Ockert Potgieter, 55, South African missionary and film director, COVID-19.
Sir John Rogers, 93, British Royal Air Force marshal.
Ray Sullivan, 44, American politician, member of the Rhode Island House of Representatives (2005–2011).
İsmet Uçma, 66, Turkish politician, MP (since 2011), lung cancer.
Nedumudi Venu, 73, Indian actor (Aaravam, Thakara, Manjil Virinja Pookkal).
Herbert L. Wilkerson, 101, American military officer, commanding general of Camp Lejeune (1972–1973).
Stewart Murray Wilson, 74, New Zealand convicted sex offender.

12
Raúl Baduel, 66, Venezuelan military officer and politician, minister of defense (2006–2008), complications from COVID-19.
René Basset, 102, French photographer.
Leon Black, 89, American college basketball coach (Texas Longhorns).
Brian Boudreau, 67, Canadian politician, Nova Scotia MLA (1993–1998).
Warren Bryant, 65, American football player (Atlanta Falcons, Los Angeles Raiders).
Dragutin Čermak, 77, Serbian basketball player and coach, Olympic silver medalist (1968).
Raúl Coloma, 93, Chilean footballer (Ferrobádminton, national team).
Ricarlo Flanagan, 41, American comedian and actor (Shameless, Walk the Prank), COVID-19.
Hubert Germain, 101, French resistance fighter and politician, mayor of Saint-Chéron, Essonne (1953–1965) and deputy (1962–1973).
Julie L. Green, 60, American visual artist, ovarian cancer.
Victor Gregg, 101, British author and World War II veteran.
Sir Thomas Harris, 76, British banker and diplomat, ambassador to South Korea (1993–1997).
Roy Horan, 71, American actor (Game of Death II, Snake in the Eagle's Shadow) and martial artist.
Eddie Jaku, 101, German-born Australian writer and Holocaust survivor.
Zinaida Korneva, 99, Russian military veteran and charity fundraiser.
Renton Laidlaw, 82, British golf broadcaster and journalist, COVID-19.
Marcus Malone, 77, American percussionist (Santana) and composer ("Soul Sacrifice").
Vladimir Markin, 64, Russian journalist and politician.
Paddy Moloney, 83, Irish musician (The Chieftains) and producer.
Chie Nakane, 94, Japanese anthropologist.
Julija Portjanko, 38, Ukrainian-born Macedonian handball player (Kometal Gjorče Petrov, Arvor 29, Macedonia national team).
Musa al-Qarni, 67, Saudi Arabian Islamic cleric.
Roger St. Pierre, 79, British journalist, writer and broadcaster.
Srikanth, 81, Indian actor (Vennira Aadai, Naanal, Selva Magal).
Kariamu Welsh, 72, American choreographer.
Laurent Wetzel, 71, French academic and politician, general councilor of the Canton of Sartrouville (1985–1998) and mayor of Sartrouville (1989–1995).

13
Otis Armstrong, 70, American Hall of Fame football player (Purdue Boilermakers, Denver Broncos).
Dario Barluzzi, 86, Italian football player (Treviso, Milan) and manager (Varese).
Timuel Black, 102, American historian and civil rights activist.
Viktor Bryukhanov, 85, Uzbek engineer, director of the Chernobyl Nuclear Power Plant (1970–1986).
Ray Cranch, 98, New Zealand rugby league player (Auckland, national team).
Piero De Masi, 84, Italian diplomat, ambassador to Namibia (1990–1996).
Ray Fosse, 74, American baseball player (Cleveland Indians, Oakland Athletics, Seattle Mariners) and broadcaster, World Series champion (1973, 1974), cancer.
David Galliford, 96, English Anglican clergyman, bishop of Hulme (1975–1984) and Bolton (1984–1991)
Gonario Gianoglio, 89, Italian politician, mayor of Nuoro (1966–1971).
Girjesh Govil, 81, Indian molecular biophysicist.
Bill Hager, 74, American politician, member of the Florida House of Representatives (2010–2018).
Andrea Haugen, 52, German singer (Cradle of Filth), writer and model, stabbed.
Jennifer L. Kelsey, 79, American epidemiologist.
Dale Kildee, 92, American politician, member of the Michigan House of Representatives (1965–1974) and Senate (1975–1976) and the U.S. House of Representatives (1977–2013).
Emmanuel de La Taille, 89, Moroccan-born French journalist and television producer, traffic collision.
Frances Line, 81, British broadcasting executive, controller of BBC Radio 2 (1986–1996).
Conrado Miranda, 92, Salvadoran football player (Atlético Marte, national team) and manager (Isidro Metapán), COVID-19.
Earl Old Person, 92, American Blackfeet chief, cancer.
Gary Paulsen, 82, American novelist (Hatchet, Dogsong, The River), cardiac arrest.
Norm Provan, 89, Australian rugby league player (St. George Dragons, New South Wales, national team).
Bela Rudenko, 88, Russian music educator.
Clem Tillion, 96, American politician, member of the Alaska House of Representatives (1963–1975), member (1975–1981) and president of the senate (1979–1981).
Agnes Tirop, 25, Kenyan Olympic long-distance runner (2020), stabbed.
Zafar Usmanov, 84, Tajik mathematician.
Sir Patrick Walker, 89, British civil servant, director general of MI5 (1988–1992).
Stephen Yang Xiangtai, 98, Chinese Roman Catholic prelate, bishop of Daming (1999–2016).
Fumio Yamamoto, 58, Japanese author, pancreatic cancer.

14
Joseph Kofi Adda, 65, Ghanaian politician, MP (2003–2013) and minister of energy (2006–2008).
Susagna Arasanz, 60, Andorran politician and economist, minister of finance (1994–2000) and general councillor (1997), cancer.
Abu Musab al-Barnawi, Nigerian Islamic militant, leader of ISWAP (since 2016). (death announced on this date)
Reg Beresford, 100, English footballer (Crystal Palace).
Clint Dunford, 78, Canadian politician, Alberta MLA (1993–2008).
Akkiraju Haragopal, 63, Indian politician, kidney failure.
Rodney Jory, 82, Australian physicist.
Ojārs Ēriks Kalniņš, 71, Latvian diplomat and politician, ambassador to the United States (1993–1999) and deputy (since 2010).
Phil Leadbetter, 59, American resonator guitar player, COVID-19.
Lee Wan-koo, 71, South Korean politician, prime minister (2015), MP (1996–2004, 2013–2016) and governor of South Chungcheong Province (2006–2009), multiple myeloma.
Tom Morey, 86, American musician, engineer, and surfboard shaper.
Mayumi Moriyama, 93, Japanese politician, chief cabinet secretary (1989–1990), minister of education (1992–1993) and justice (2001–2003).
Derek Pearsall, 90, British medievalist.
Sir Gerry Robinson, 72, Irish-born British television presenter (Can Gerry Robinson Fix the NHS?) and executive, chair of Arts Council England (1998–2004).
Sarkasi Said, 81, Singaporean batik artist.
Raymond Setlakwe, 93, Canadian entrepreneur, lawyer and politician, senator (2000–2003).
Vic Sison, 84, Filipino footballer (Lions, national team), COVID-19.
Gennady Sizov, 80, Russian diplomat, ambassador to Bolivia (1998–2003).
Traudl Stark, 91, Austrian child actress (A Mother's Love, The Fox of Glenarvon, Passion).
Diane Weyermann, 66, American film producer (Collective, An Inconvenient Truth, RBG), lung cancer.
Marko Živić, 49, Serbian actor (Balkan Shadows, The Belgrade Phantom) and television host (Marko Živić Show), COVID-19.

15
T.K. Abdullah, 92, Indian Islamic scholar.
Tuineau Alipate, 54, Tongan-born American football player (Minnesota Vikings, Saskatchewan Roughriders, New York Jets).
Sir David Amess, 69, British politician, MP (since 1983), stabbed.
Leland I. Anderson, 93, American electrical engineer.
Avi Barot, 29, Indian cricketer (Saurashtra), heart attack.
Dan Benishek, 69, American politician, member of the U.S. House of Representatives (2011–2017).
André Cognat, 83, French Guinean Wayana tribal chief.
Joanna Cameron, 73, American actress (The Secrets of Isis, I Love My Wife, Pretty Maids All in a Row), stroke.
Michel de Roy, 72, French author.
Kihoto Hollohon, 89, Indian politician, Nagaland MLA (1977–2013).
Farrukh Jaffar, 88, Indian actress (Umrao Jaan, What Will People Say, Gulabo Sitabo).
Larry Koon, 77, American politician, member of the South Carolina House of Representatives (1975–2005).
Alfredo López Austin, 85, Mexican historian.
Gabriel Moran, 86, American academic and theologian.
Madame Nguyen Van Thieu, 90, Vietnamese socialite, first lady of South Vietnam (1967–1975).
Miguel de Oliveira, 74, Brazilian middleweight boxer, WBC light-middleweight world champion (1975), pancreatic cancer.
Ottó Prouza, 88, Hungarian Olympic volleyball player (1964).
G. K. Govinda Rao, 84, Indian actor (Grahana, Maha Parva, Malgudi Days) and writer.
Mario Andrea Rigoni, 73, Italian poet and writer.
Abel Rodríguez, 50, Cuban actor (El clon).
Reinhold Roth, 68, German motorcycle racer.
Gerd Ruge, 93, German journalist (ARD, Die Welt), author and filmmaker.
Metro Rybchuk, 85, Canadian politician, Saskatchewan MLA (1982–1986).
Vano Siradeghyan, 74, Armenian politician and writer, minister of internal affairs (1992–1996) and mayor of Yerevan (1996–1998).
Pornsak Songsaeng, 60, Thai luk thung and mor lam singer, heart attack.
Dorothy Steel, 95, American actress (Black Panther, Poms, Jumanji: The Next Level).
Don Stonesifer, 94, American football player (Chicago Cardinals).
Masten Wanjala, 20, Kenyan suspected serial killer, beaten.
Dave Washington, 73, American football player (Denver Broncos, Buffalo Bills, San Francisco 49ers).

16
Robert Bainbridge, 90, English footballer (York City, Frickley Athletic, Selby Town).
Paul Blanca, 62, Dutch art photographer.
Leo Boivin, 89, Canadian Hall of Fame ice hockey player (Boston Bruins, Toronto Maple Leafs, Pittsburgh Penguins) and coach.
Denise Bryer, 93, British voice actress (Terrahawks, Return to Oz, Labyrinth).
Felipe Cazals, 84, Mexican film director (The Garden of Aunt Isabel, Canoa: A Shameful Memory, Bajo la metralla), screenwriter and producer.
José Ramón Ceschi, 80, Argentine Roman Catholic priest, writer, and television presenter.
Geoffrey Chater, 100, British actor (Mapp & Lucia, Callan, Barry Lyndon).
Wes Cooley, 65, American motorcycle road racer, complications from diabetes.
Peter Dickson, 92, British historian.
Sir Joseph Dwyer, 82, British civil engineer and businessman.
Dennis Franks, 68, American football player (Philadelphia Eagles, Detroit Lions).
Reginald Green, 86, American development economist.
Frank Hargrove, 94, American politician, member of the Virginia House of Delegates (1982–2010).
Alan Hawkshaw, 84, British composer (Grange Hill, Countdown, Channel 4 News) and keyboard player, pneumonia.
Kevin Hevey, 98, Australian footballer (Hawthorn).
Roger Hui, 67, Canadian computer scientist, co-developer of J.
George Kinnell, 83, Scottish footballer (Aberdeen, Stoke City, Sunderland).
Viktor Kryzhanivsky, 59, Ukrainian diplomat, ambassador extraordinary and plenipotentiary of Ukraine, fall.
Betty Lynn, 95, American actress (The Andy Griffith Show, Cheaper by the Dozen, Meet Me in Las Vegas).
Máire Mhac an tSaoi, 99, Irish poet and linguist.
Freddie Joe Nunn, 59, American football player (Arizona Cardinals, Indianapolis Colts).
Hiroshi Ono, 64, Japanese pixel artist (Namco).
Achille Perilli, 94, Italian painter and sculptor.
Jean Rochon, 83, Canadian politician, Quebec MNA (1994–2003).
Coleta de Sabata, 86, Romanian engineer, rector of Politehnica University of Timișoara (1981–1989).
Paul Salata, 94, American football player (San Francisco 49ers, Baltimore Colts) and actor (Angels in the Outfield).
Pat Studstill, 83, American football player (Detroit Lions, Los Angeles Rams, New England Patriots).
Ron Tutt, 83, American drummer (Elvis Presley, Neil Diamond, Roy Orbison).

17
Ahmad Shah Ahmadzai, 77, Afghan politician, acting prime minister (1995–1996).
Laila al-Atrash, 73, Jordanian writer and journalist.
Sergio Berlinguer, 87, Italian politician and diplomat, secretary general of the Presidency (1987–1992).
Anders Bodelsen, 84, Danish writer.
Chuck Bundrant, 79, American businessman, co-founder and chairman of Trident Seafoods.
Brian Gassaway, 49, American mixed martial artist (UFC).
Bruce Gaston, 74, American Thai classical musician, liver cancer.
Nina Gruzintseva, 87, Russian Olympic sprint canoer (1964).
Hido, 52, Japanese professional wrestler (FMW).
Toshihiro Iijima, 89, Japanese film director (Ultra Q, Ultraman, Daigoro vs. Goliath) and screenwriter, aspiration pneumonia.
Brendan Kennelly, 85, Irish poet.
Abdul Jamil Khan, 91, Pakistani doctor and hospital chairman.
Charlie Kulp, 96, American aerobatic pilot.
David M. Livingston, 80, American physician.
Mahipal Maderna, 69, Indian politician, Rajasthan MLA (2003–2013), cancer.
Mike McCoy, 73, American petroleum engineer.
Owen Medlock, 83, English footballer (Chelmsford City, Chelsea, Oxford United).
Pamela Rose, 103, British actress.
Ernie Ross, 79, British politician, MP (1979–2005).
Floyd Salas, 90, American novelist and social activist.
Léon Vandermeersch, 93, French sinologist.
Robin Wood, 77, Paraguayan comic book writer (Nippur de Lagash, Dago).
Margaret York, 80, American police officer.

18
Jack Angel, 90, American voice actor (Voltron, The Transformers, A.I. Artificial Intelligence).
Christopher Ayres, 56, American voice actor (Dragon Ball, One Piece, Black Butler), complications from COPD.
Manuel Batakian, 91, Greek Armenian Catholic hierarch, eparch of the U.S. and Canada (2005–2011).
Val Bisoglio, 95, American actor (Saturday Night Fever, The Frisco Kid, Quincy, M.E.), Lewy body dementia.
Serhiy Burimenko, 51, Ukrainian footballer (Artania, Naftokhimik Kremenchuk, Evis Mykolaiv).
Ralph Carmichael, 94, American composer (The Blob, My Mother the Car) and arranger (Nat King Cole).
Franco Cerri, 95, Italian jazz guitarist.
Maxine Conder, 95, American Navy rear admiral, director, Navy Nurse Corps (1975–1979).
Tony Coop, 87, British golfer. (death announced on this date)
Jo-Carroll Dennison, 97, American pageant winner (Miss America 1942) and actress (Winged Victory, The Jolson Story), COPD.
Jaroslav Dočkal, 81, Czech football player (AC Sparta Prague, FK Teplice) and coach.
David Finn, 100, American public relations executive and photographer, co-founder of Ruder Finn.
Fred Goodall, 83, New Zealand cricket umpire.
Edita Gruberová, 74, Slovak operatic soprano.
Philippe Hadengue, 89, French writer and painter.
Willy Kemp, 95, Luxembourgish road bicycle racer.
Sami Kohen, 93, Turkish journalist (Milliyet, The New York Times).
János Kornai, 93, Hungarian economist.
Werner Lambersy, 79, Belgian poet.
William Lucking, 80, American actor (Sons of Anarchy, The Rundown, The Magnificent Seven Ride!).
Pamela McCorduck, 80, English-born American author and journalist.
Vamona Navelcar, 91, Indian painter.
Miguel Palmer, 78, Mexican actor (Bodas de odio, Dos hogares).
Colin Powell, 84, American general and politician, chairman of the Joint Chiefs of Staff (1989–1993) and secretary of state (2001–2005), complications from COVID-19.
Sukhdev Rajbhar, 70, Indian politician, Uttar Pradesh MLA (1991–1995, 2002–2012, since 2017).
Shankar Rao, 84, Indian actor (Silli Lalli).
Charles Ryan, 94, American politician, mayor of Springfield, Massachusetts (1962–1967, 2004–2008).
Sean Wainui, 25, New Zealand rugby union player (Taranaki, Chiefs, Māori All Blacks), traffic collision.
Bandula Warnapura, 68, Sri Lankan cricketer (Bloomfield, national team).
Xu Qin, 93, Chinese politician, delegate to the National People's Congress (1978–1998).
Bill Zeliff, 85, American politician, member of the U.S. House of Representatives (1991–1997).

19
Kjersti Alveberg, 73, Norwegian dancer and choreographer.
Abdelouahed Belkeziz, 82, Moroccan diplomat, minister of foreign affairs (1983–1985) and general secretary of OIC (2001–2004).
Leslie Bricusse, 90, British composer (Willy Wonka & the Chocolate Factory), lyricist ("Goldfinger", "You Only Live Twice") and playwright, Oscar winner (1968, 1983).
Patrick Byrne, 96, Irish politician, TD (1956–1969).
Antonio Coggio, 82, Italian composer, arranger, and record producer.
Michel Degand, 86, French artist.
Bob Graham, 85, New Zealand rugby union player and coach (Auckland, Junior All Blacks).
Tamara Gudima, 85, Russian politician, deputy (1993–2000).
Pierre Kerkhoffs, 85, Dutch footballer (SC Enschede, PSV, national team).
Sir Archie Lamb, 99, British fighter pilot and diplomat, ambassador to Norway (1978–1980).
Branko Mamula, 100, Serbian politician and military officer, minister of defence of Yugoslavia (1982–1988), COVID-19.
Michel Nadeau, 74, Canadian administrator and journalist.
Tullis Onstott, 66, American geologist, complications from lung cancer.
Donald Lewis Shaw, 84, American communication scholar.
Gary Summerhays, 71, Canadian boxer.
Bernard Tiphaine, 83, French actor.

20
Carlo Amato, 83, Italian-born Sammarinese-American businessman and diplomat, ambassador of the Sovereign Military Order of Malta to St. Lucia and St. Vincent and the Grenadines (since 1983).
Pat Campbell, 61, American talk radio host (KFAQ), brain cancer.
Mihaly Csikszentmihalyi, 87, Hungarian-American psychologist (flow state concept).
Nick Dimitri, 88, American stuntman (Hard Times, The Rat Patrol) and actor (Out for Justice).
Douglas Ewald, 84, American politician, member of the Minnesota House of Representatives (1975–1983).
Dino Felisetti, 102, Italian politician and lawyer, deputy (1972–1987).
Walter Gratzer, 89, German-born British biophysical chemist.
Tom Hannegan, 51, American politician, member of the Missouri House of Representatives (since 2017), stroke.
Hans Haselböck, 93, Austrian organist and composer.
Miguel La Fay Bardi, 86, American-born Peruvian Roman Catholic prelate, territorial prelate of Sicuani (1999–2013).
Michael Laughlin, 82, American film director (Strange Invaders), producer (Two-Lane Blacktop), and writer (Town & Country), complications from COVID-19.
Robert H. MacQuarrie, 86, Canadian politician, Northwest Territories MLA (1979–1987).
Dragan Pantelić, 69, Serbian footballer (Radnički Niš, Bordeaux, Yugoslavia national team), COVID-19.
Proterios Pavlopoulos, 75, Greek Orthodox prelate.
Jerry Pinkney, 81, American illustrator (John Henry, The Talking Eggs: A Folktale from the American South) and children's writer (The Lion & the Mouse), heart attack.
Eudora Quartey-Koranteng, Ghanaian diplomat, ambassador extraordinaire to Italy (since 2019), cardiac arrest.
Horacio A. Tenorio, 86, Mexican Latter-day Saints general authority, member of the Second Quorum of the Seventy (1989–1994).
Bjorn Thorsrud, 58, American music producer, programmer, and audio engineer.
Robert Thurston, 84, American science fiction author.
Barry Turner, 75, Canadian politician, MP (1984–1988), cancer.
Sardar Muhammad Yaqoob, Pakistani politician, deputy speaker of the National Assembly (2002–2007).
Nyapanyapa Yunupingu, 76, Australian Yolngu painter.

21
Yasin Abu Bakr, 80, Trinidadian Islamic leader (Jamaat al Muslimeen) and coupist, leader of the Jamaat al Muslimeen coup attempt.
George Butler, 78, British-American filmmaker (Pumping Iron, The Endurance: Shackleton's Legendary Antarctic Expedition, Going Upriver), pneumonia.
William G. Conway, 91, American zoologist, ornithologist and conservationist.
Jean-Jacques Duval, 91, French-born American artist.
Einár, 19, Swedish rapper, shot.
Kathy Flores, 66, American rugby union player (national team), colon cancer.
Hartmut Geerken, 82, German author, musician and composer.
Gurie Georgiu, 52, Romanian Orthodox bishop of Deva and Hunedoara (since 2009), COVID-19.
Bernard Haitink, 92, Dutch conductor (Royal Concertgebouw Orchestra, Chicago Symphony Orchestra) and opera artistic director (Royal Opera House).
Hassan Hanafi, 86, Egyptian philosopher.
Martha Henry, 83, American-born Canadian actress (The Wars, Dancing in the Dark, Mustard Bath).
István Herman, 74, Hungarian politician, MP (2010–2014).
Halyna Hutchins, 42, Ukrainian-American cinematographer (Archenemy, Darlin', Rust), accidental shooting.
Pierre Jamjian, 72, Lebanese actor.
Michihiko Kano, 79, Japanese politician, MP (1976–1979, 2005–2012) and minister of agriculture (2010–2012).
Tigran Karapetyan, 76, Armenian politician, chairman of the People's Party.
Vladimir Karolev, 60, Bulgarian politician and economist, member of the Municipal Council of Sofia (2003–2011).
Simon Lewty, 80, English artist.
Wes Magee, 82, British poet and children's author.
Robin McNamara, 74, American singer-songwriter ("Lay a Little Lovin' on Me") and musician.
Billy Moran, 87, American baseball player (Los Angeles Angels, Cleveland Indians).
Jarosław Musiał, 58–59, Polish comic book artist (Fantastyka, Magia i Miecz, Fenix).
Kamela Portuges, 58, American puppeteer (Bicentennial Man, James and the Giant Peach, Being John Malkovich), pulmonary embolism.
Žarko Potočnjak, 75, Croatian actor (Visitors from the Galaxy, The Glembays, Go, Yellow).
Quandra Prettyman, 88, American academic.
Tom Samek, 71, Czech-born Australian artist. (death announced on this date)
Saori Sugimoto, 56, Japanese voice actress (Shima Shima Tora no Shimajirō), heart failure.
Thích Phổ Tuệ, 104, Vietnamese Buddhist monk.
Jean Verdun, 90, French writer and Freemasonry grand master.
Anđelko Vuletić, 88, Croatian-Bosnian poet and novelist.

22
K. A. Abraham, 79, Indian cardiologist and writer.
Janali Akbarov, 81, Azerbaijani mugham singer.
Lilli Alanen, 80, Finnish philosopher.
Lía Bermúdez, 91, Venezuelan sculptor.
Jay Black, 82, American singer (Jay and the Americans), pneumonia.
Dave Cuzens, 88, Australian footballer (Richmond).
Adolfo J. de Bold, 79, Argentinian-Canadian cardiovascular researcher.
Cap Dierks, 89, American politician, member of the Nebraska Legislature (1987–2003, 2007–2011).
Irshat Fakhritdinov, 56, Russian politician, deputy (2007–2016), COVID-19.
Ryszard Filipski, 87, Polish actor (Hubal, An Ancient Tale: When the Sun Was a God) and theatre and film director.
Valentin Gapontsev, 82, Russian-American businessman, founder of IPG Photonics.
Ju Gau-jeng, 67, Taiwanese politician, member of the Legislative Yuan (1987–1999), colorectal cancer.
Vibjörn Karlén, 84, Swedish geographer and geologist.
Vera Kuzmina, 97, Russian actress and Chuvash activist.
Dalma Mádl, 88, Hungarian socialite, first lady (2000–2005).
Nabiel Makarim, 75, Indonesian politician, minister of the environment (2001–2004).
Serhiy Morozov, 71, Ukrainian football player (Zorya Luhansk, CSKA Moscow) and manager (Vorskla Poltava), COVID-19.
Álex Quiñónez, 32, Ecuadorian Olympic sprinter (2012), shot.
Joan Ringelheim, 82, American oral history archive director (USHMM), breast cancer.
Peter Scolari, 66, American actor (Newhart, Bosom Buddies, Girls), Emmy winner (2016), leukemia.
Vyacheslav Vedenin, 80, Russian cross-country skier, Olympic champion (1972).
Vera Venczel, 75, Hungarian actress (Stars of Eger, The Toth Family).
Sara Wilford, 89, American psychologist.
Udo Zimmermann, 78, German composer (Weiße Rose, Der Schuhu und die fliegende Prinzessin), musicologist, and opera director.

23
Mick Allan, 83, Australian Olympic rower (1956, 1960, 1964).
Willie Aspinall, 78, English rugby league player (Warrington, Rochdale Hornets).
Mark Barrington-Ward, 93, British newspaper editor (Oxford Mail).
Marcel Bluwal, 96, French film director (Carom Shots, The New Adventures of Vidocq) and screenwriter.
Fabrizio Calvi, 67, French investigative journalist (Libération) and writer, suicide.
Nishat Khan Daha, 73, Pakistani politician, Punjab MPA (since 2008).
Alfredo Diez Nieto, 103, Cuban composer and conductor.
Theodore H. Geballe, 101, American physicist.
V. Govindan, 80, Indian politician, Tamil Nadu MLA (1989–1991, 1996–2001).
Abdelbaki Hermassi, 83, Tunisian politician, minister of foreign affairs (2004–2005).
Jim Malone, 95, Australian footballer (North Melbourne).
Minoo Mumtaz, 79, Indian actress (Kaagaz Ke Phool, Sahib Bibi Aur Ghulam, Gazal) and dancer, cancer.
Bob Neumeier, 70, American sportscaster (WBZ-TV, ESPN, NBC Sports), heart failure.
George Olesen, 60, Danish weightlifter.
Peter Pharoah, 87, British public health scientist, dementia.
Carolyn Pollan, 84, American politician, member of the Arkansas House of Representatives (1975–1999).
Valentyna Rakytianska, 73, Ukrainian librarian, director of the Kharkiv Korolenko State Scientific Library.
Aleksandr Rogozhkin, 72, Russian film director (Peculiarities of the National Hunt, Operation Happy New Year, The Cuckoo) and writer.
Sir Michael Rutter, 88, British child psychiatrist.
Vishaka Siriwardana, 65, Sri Lankan actress, (Christhu Charithaya, Bheeshanaye Athuru Kathawak), cancer.
Cyrille Tahay, 82, Belgian politician, member of the Parliament of Wallonia (1995-1999).
Sirkka Turkka, 82, Finnish poet.
Grant Woods, 67, American politician, Arizona attorney general (1991–1999), heart attack.

24
Fredrik Andersson Hed, 49, Swedish golfer, cancer.
Arved Birnbaum, 59, German actor (We Are the Night).
Bùi Diễm, 98, Vietnamese diplomat, ambassador of South Vietnam to the United States (1965–1972).
Erna de Vries, 98, German Holocaust survivor and lecturer.
Sir John Morrison Forbes, 96, British Royal Navy admiral, Flag Officer, Plymouth (1977–1979).
Gene Freidman, 50, Russian-American taxi executive, heart attack.
Arnold Hano, 99, American novelist, biographer and journalist.
Mike Hoffmann, 67, American guitarist and record producer, pulmonary embolism.
Muhammad Hudori, 53, Indonesian bureaucrat, secretary-general of the Ministry of Home Affairs (since 2020).
Mamat Khalid, 58, Malaysian screenwriter and director (Puteri Gunung Ledang, Zombi Kampung Pisang, Hantu Kak Limah).
Krzysztof Kiersznowski, 70, Polish actor (Vabank, Fever, The Mighty Angel).
Abdul Rahim Majzoob, 86, Pakistani Pashto poet, writer, and jurist.
John Murton, 79, Australian footballer (Collingwood).
Indira Nath, 83, Indian immunoligist.
Sonny Osborne, 83, American bluegrass musician (Osborne Brothers) and banjo player, stroke.
Chandrishan Perera, 60, Sri Lankan rugby union player (national team).
John Traynor, 73, Irish criminal, cancer.
Sunao Tsuboi, 96, Japanese hibakusha, anti-nuclear and anti-war activist.
James Michael Tyler, 59, American actor (Friends, Motel Blue), prostate cancer.

25
Abdelmajid Chaker, 94, Tunisian politician, deputy (1959–1974).
Willie Cobbs, 89, American blues singer, harmonica player and songwriter ("You Don't Love Me").
Fofi Gennimata, 56, Greek politician, MP (2000–2002, 2012, since 2015) and president of the PASOK (since 2015), cancer.
Jean-Claude Guibal, 80, French politician, deputy (1997–2017) and mayor of Menton (since 1989), heart attack.
Herbie Herbert, 73, American music manager (Journey, Roxette, Europe) and musician.
Paul D. House, 78, Canadian fast food executive, COO (1992–2005), CEO (2005–2008), and president (1995–2013) of Tim Hortons.
Anna Jekiełek, 83, Polish set and costume designer.
Fernando Herrera Mamani, 55, Peruvian politician, congressman (since 2021).
Berry Mayall, 85, British sociologist and academic, cancer.
Ivy Nicholson, 88, American model and actress.
Gerard Phalen, 87, Canadian politician, senator (2001–2009).
Patrick Reyntiens, 95, British stained glass artist.
Eeileen Romero, 47, Salvadoran politician and disability rights activist, deputy (2018–2021), cardiac arrest.
Aleksandar Shalamanov, 80, Bulgarian footballer (Slavia Sofia, national team) and Olympic alpine skier (1960).
Sudi Silalahi, 72, Indonesian politician and lieutenant general, secretary of state (2009–2014).
Tim Thompson, 97, American baseball player (Brooklyn Dodgers, Kansas City Athletics, Detroit Tigers).

26
Albie Bates, 80, South African rugby union player (Western Transvaal, Northern Transvaal, national team)and coach.
Gilberto Braga, 75, Brazilian screenwriter (Escrava Isaura, Dancin' Days, Água Viva), esophagus perforation.
Linda Carlson, 76, American actress (The Beverly Hillbillies, Murder One, Kaz), complications from amyotrophic lateral sclerosis.
Umberto Colombo, 88, Italian footballer (Juventus, Atalanta, national team).
Joe Lee Dunn, 75, American college football player and coach (New Mexico Lobos, Ole Miss Rebels).
James L. Emery, American politician, member of the New York State Assembly (1965–1982) and administrator of the St. Lawrence Seaway Development Corporation (1984–1991).
Lester Eriksson, 78, Swedish Olympic swimmer (1964, 1968).
Bruce Flick, 88, Australian Olympic basketball player (1956).
Tiemen Groen, 75, Dutch Olympic cyclist (1964).
*Guan Dee Koh Hoi, 67, Malaysian politician, senator (since 2020), COVID-19.
Bobby Kline, 92, American baseball player (Washington Senators).
Miguel Leal, 60, Portuguese Olympic equestrian (1996).
Mike Lucci, 81, American football player (Cleveland Browns, Detroit Lions).
Rose Lee Maphis, 98, American country singer.
Nawaf Massalha, 77, Israeli politician, member of the Knesset (1988–2003), complications from COVID-19.
Ludovica Modugno, 72, Italian actress (Cado dalle nubi, Quo Vado?, Magical Nights) and voice actress.
Vic Naismith, 85, Australian footballer (Richmond).
Đuro Perić, 91, Serbian politician, MP (2008–2012, since 2020), COVID-19.
Roh Tae-woo, 88, South Korean politician, president (1988–1993), minister of home affairs (1982–1983) and sports (1982).
Uri Rubin, 77, Israeli Islamic scholar.
Mort Sahl, 94, Canadian-born American comedian and actor (In Love and War, All the Young Men).
Walter Smith, 73, Scottish football player (Dundee United) and manager (Rangers, national team).
Lil Terselius, 76, Swedish actress (Games of Love and Loneliness), intracranial hemorrhage.
Glen Tuckett, 93, American college baseball coach and athletic director (BYU Cougars).
Isabel Turner, 85, British-born Canadian politician, mayor of Kingston, Ontario (2000–2003), pneumonia.
Russell Woolf, 57, Australian radio presenter (ABC Radio Perth).

27
Sandy Carmichael, 77, Scottish rugby union player (West of Scotland, Scotland national team, British & Irish Lions).
William Cook, 57, American computer scientist (AppleScript).
Aramesh Dustdar, 90, Iranian philosopher.
Bob Ferry, 84, American basketball player (Detroit Pistons, St. Louis Hawks) and executive (Washington Bullets).
Bettina Gaus, 64, German journalist (Deutsche Welle, Der Spiegel).
Tyler Herron, 35, American baseball player (Palm Beach Cardinals).
Russell Jennings, 66, American politician, member of the Kansas House of Representatives (since 2013), cancer.
Gun Jönsson, 91, Swedish actress (Harry Munter, A Guy and a Gal).
Ahmad Kamal Abdullah, 80, Malaysian poet and writer.
Gay McIntyre, 88, British jazz musician.
Bernd Nickel, 72, German footballer (Eintracht Frankfurt, Young Boys, West Germany national team).
Jacek Niedźwiedzki, 70, Polish tennis player and coach.
Per T. Ohlsson, 63, Swedish journalist (Lundagård, Expressen, Sydsvenskan).
Arnošt Pazdera, 92, Czech footballer (Sparta Prague, FK Teplice, Czechoslovakia national team).
Isaías Pérez Saldaña, 72, Spanish politician, member of the Parliament of Andalusia (1990–2008), and mayor of Ayamonte (1991–1996).
Wakefield Poole, 85, American dancer, choreographer, and adult filmmaker (Boys in the Sand, Bijou).
Salem Nanjundaiah Subba Rao, 92, Indian social worker, cardiac arrest.
Jonathan Reynolds, 79, American screenwriter (Micki & Maude, My Stepmother Is an Alien, Leonard Part 6) and playwright, organ failure.
P. J. Rhodes, 81, British academic and ancient historian.
Abba Sayyadi Ruma, 59, Nigerian politician, minister of agriculture (2007–2010).
Paul Smart, 78, English short circuit motorcycle road racer, traffic collision.
Christopher Wenner, 66, British-East Timorese journalist (Channel 4 News) and television presenter (Blue Peter), throat cancer.
Gerald R. Young, American intelligence official, deputy director of the National Security Agency (1988–1990).
Ludovic Zanoni, 86, Romanian Olympic cyclist (1960).
Peter Zelinka, 64, Slovak Olympic biathlete (1980, 1984).

28
Ray Allsopp, 87, Australian footballer (Richmond, Victoria).
Ali Baghbanbashi, 97, Iranian Olympic long-distance runner (1952, 1956).
Boris Binkovski, 76, German footballer (Maribor). (death announced on this date)
Lisa Brodyaga, 81, American human rights activist.
Pavel Coruț, 72, Romanian writer and intelligence officer.
Jorge Cumbo, 78, Argentine quena player (Los Incas), cancer.
Raša Đelmaš, 71, Serbian rock musician (YU Grupa, Zebra, Pop Mašina).
John Marion Grant, 60, American convict, execution by lethal injection.
Uwe Grimm, 58, German mathematician and physicist.
Linwood Holton, 98, American politician, governor of Virginia (1970–1974).
Calvin Jones, 70, American football player (Denver Broncos).
Rama Khandwala, 94, Indian Army officer and tour guide.
Raymond Guy LeBlanc, 76, Canadian musician and poet.
Florence Alice Lubega, 103, Ugandan politician, MP (1962–1980).
Olena Lytovchenko, 58, Ukrainian writer, COVID-19.
Jovita Moore, 54, American news anchor (WSB-TV), brain cancer. 
M. Krishnan Nair, 81, Indian oncologist, founding director of the Thiruvananthapuram RCC.
N. Nanmaran, 74, Indian politician, Tamil Nadu MLA (2001–2011), cardiac arrest.
Francesco de Notaris, 77, Italian politician, senator (1994–1996) and journalist.
Reinaldo Pared Pérez, 65, Dominican politician, deputy (1998–2002), member (since 2006) and president (2006–2014, 2016–2020) of the senate, suicide.
Cecil Perkins, 80, American baseball player (New York Yankees).
Sir Peter Petrie, 5th Baronet, 89, British diplomat, ambassador to Belgium (1985–1989).
Jim Pollock, 91, Canadian politician, Ontario MPP (1981–1990).
Camille Saviola, 71, American actress (The Purple Rose of Cairo, Addams Family Values, Star Trek: Deep Space Nine), heart failure.
Sir Thomas Minshull Stockdale, 2nd Baronett, 81, British barrister.
Dick Szymanski, 89, American football player and executive (Baltimore Colts).
Mike Trivisonno, 74, American radio broadcaster (WTAM).
Davy Tweed, 61, Irish rugby union player (national team) and politician, Ballymena Borough councillor (1997–2015), traffic collision.
Miklós Zelei, 72, Hungarian poet, writer and journalist.
Victor V. Zhenchenko, 85, Ukrainian poet, translator and singer.

29
Kit Berry, British author.
Geraldo Brindeiro, 73, Brazilian jurist, prosecutor general (1995–2003), COVID-19.
Mehdi Cerbah, 68, Algerian footballer (JS Kabylie, RC Kouba, national team).
Iran Darroudi, 85, Iranian artist, cardiac arrest from COVID-19.
Dean Derby, 86, American football player (Pittsburgh Steelers, Minnesota Vikings).
Gustave Diamond, 93, American jurist, judge (since 1978) and chief judge (1992–1994) of the U.S. District Court for Western Pennsylvania.
Malcolm Dome, 66, English music journalist (Record Mirror, Kerrang!, Metal Hammer).
Reidar Due, 98, Norwegian politician, MP (1977–1989) and county governor of Sør-Trøndelag (1986–1993).
José Antonio González i Casanova, 85, Spanish jurist, academic and politician, stroke.
Herwig Maehler, 86, German papyrologist.
Eliyahu Matza, 86, Israeli judge, justice of the Supreme Court (1991–2005).
Ashley Mallett, 76, Australian cricketer (South Australia, national team).
Aleksandr Martyshkin, 78, Russian rower, Olympic bronze medallist (1968).
Charles D. Metcalf, 88, American major general and museum director (National Museum of the United States Air Force).
Raoul Middleman, 86, American painter.
Clément Mouamba, 77, Congolese politician, prime minister (2016–2021), minister of finance (1992–1994), COVID-19.
Alina Obidniak, 90, Polish theatre director and actress.
Octavio Ocaña, 22, Mexican actor (Vecinos, Lola: Once Upon a Time, La mexicana y el güero), shot.
Bettina Plevan, 75, American lawyer, acute myeloma leukemia.
Puneeth Rajkumar, 46, Indian actor (Appu, Abhi, Maurya), heart attack.
Jim Small, 88, Australian politician, New South Wales MLA (1985–1999).
Renato Zanettovich, 100, Italian violinist.

30
Pepi Bader, 80, German bobsledder, Olympic silver medallist (1968, 1972).
G. S. Bali, 67, Indian politician, Himachal Pradesh MLA (1998–2017), complications from kidney transplant.
Harris Berman, 83, American physician, dean of Tufts University School of Medicine (2009–2019).
Alan Davidson, 92, Australian Hall of Fame cricketer (New South Wales, national team).
René Donoyan, 81, French football player (AS Saint-Étienne, FC Nantes) and manager (FC Nantes II).
Tony Featherstone, 72, Canadian ice hockey player (Oakland/California Golden Seals, Minnesota North Stars, Toronto Toros).
Maurice Frilot, 80, American Olympic boxer (1964).
Eric Greif, 59, American band manager and lawyer. (death announced on this date)
Göran Johansson, 64, Swedish Olympic rower (1980).
Valeriy Khmelko, 82, Ukrainian sociologist.
Vyacheslav Khrynin, 84, Russian basketball player, Olympic silver medallist (1964).
Igor Kirillov, 89, Russian news anchor (CT USSR), COVID-19.
Bernard Malango, 79–80, Zambian Anglican prelate, archbishop of Central Africa (2001–2006).
Valentina Malyavina, 80, Russian actress (Ivan's Childhood, A Literature Lesson, King Stag).
Crossbelt Mani, 86, Indian film director (Midumidukki, Manushyabandhangal, Nadeenadanmare Avasyamundu).
Gilberto Milani, 89, Italian Grand Prix motorcycle road racer.
Basílio do Nascimento, 71, East Timorese Roman Catholic prelate, bishop of Baucau (since 2004), heart attack.
Bert Newton, 83, Australian television presenter (In Melbourne Tonight, Good Morning Australia, Bert's Family Feud).
Holger Obermann, 85, German footballer and journalist (Sportschau), COVID-19.
Francisco Ou, 81, Taiwanese diplomat, minister of foreign affairs (2008–2009), ambassador to Guatemala (1990–1996, 2002–2008) and Nicaragua (1984–1985), pneumonia.
Jerry Remy, 68, American baseball player (California Angels, Boston Red Sox) and broadcaster (NESN), cancer.
Gladys del Río, 79, Chilean actress and comedian.
Justus Rosenberg, 100, Polish-born American educator, Resistance member during World War II.
Ron Serafini, 67, American ice hockey player (California Golden Seals).
Sonia Sheridan, 96, American artist.
Lafayette Stribling, 87, American basketball coach (Mississippi Valley State University, Tougaloo College).
Bernardo Tengarrinha, 32, Portuguese footballer (Vitória de Setúbal, CSKA Sofia, Boavista), Hodgkin's lymphoma.

31
Doğan Akhanlı, 64, Turkish-German writer, cancer.
Fayek 'Adly 'Azb, 63, Egyptian Olympic boxer (1984). (death announced on this date)
Joan Carlyle, 90, English operatic soprano.
Chang Kuo-tung, 91–92, Taiwanese actor (Love Family) and film producer, pancreatic cancer.
Jean-Marie Chevalier, 80, French economist.
Fernando de Parias Merry, 84, Spanish politician, mayor of Seville (1975–1977) and member of Cortes Españolas (1975–1977).
Frank Farrar, 92, American politician, attorney general (1963–1969) and governor (1969–1971) of South Dakota.
Joan Ford, 95, British-born Canadian physician, assisted suicide.
Prabhakar Jog, 89, Indian violinist.
Valeriy Korotkov, 70, Ukrainian businessman. (death announced on this date)
Sir Jim Lester, 89, British politician, MP (1974–1997).
Dorothy Manley, 94, British sprint runner, Olympic silver medallist (1948).
Alpo Martinez, 55, American drug dealer, shot.
James Jemut Masing, 72, Malaysian politician, Sarawak MLA (since 1983), complications from COVID-19.
Miguel Mena, 34, Peruvian-born American jockey, traffic collision.
Peter Philpott, 86, Australian cricketer (New South Wales, national team), complications from a fall.
Walter Reichert, 92, American politician, member of the Kentucky House of Representatives (1964–1966) and Senate (1966–1974).
Luigi Reitani, 62, Italian germanist, translator and literary critic, COVID-19.
Michel Robidoux, 78, Canadian musician.
Graham Ross, 76–77, British theoretical physicist.
Dean Shek, 72, Hong Kong actor (Drunken Master, A Better Tomorrow II, The Dragon from Russia), cancer.
Ioannis Stathopoulos, 86–87, Greek politician, MP (1974–1993).
Antonia Terzi, 50, Italian aerodynamicist, traffic collision.
Dame Catherine Tizard, 90, New Zealand politician, mayor of Auckland (1983–1990) and governor-general (1990–1996).
António Topa, 67, Portuguese engineer and politician, MP (since 2015).
Włodzimierz Trams, 77, Polish Olympic basketball player (1968).
Aurel Vainer, 89, Romanian politician, deputy (2004–2016).
Simon Young, Irish radio presenter (RTÉ 2fm).
Avishag Zahavi, 99, Israeli botanist.
Andrzej Zaorski, 78, Polish actor (The Mother of Kings, Westerplatte, Pięciu).

References

2021-10
10